Broze is a commune in southern France.
Broze may also refer to:
Broze, Chitral, administrative unit in the Chitral district of Pakistan
Laurence Broze, Belgian mathematical economist
Vanessa Broze, actress in Cinemax science-fiction series Forbidden Science